Jean-Albin Emile Régis (19 February 1912 – 12 December 1981) was a French sports shooter. He competed in the 100 m running deer event at the 1952 Summer Olympics.

References

1912 births
1981 deaths
French male sport shooters
Olympic shooters of France
Shooters at the 1952 Summer Olympics
Sportspeople from Aveyron